The men's 200 metres event at the 1970 Summer Universiade was held at the Stadio Comunale in Turin on 5 and 6 September 1970.

Medalists

Results

Heats
Held on 5 September

Wind:Heat 1: -1.0 m/s, Heat 2: ? m/s, Heat 3: -0.5 m/s, Heat 4: 0.0 m/s, Heat 5: ? m/s, Heat 6: 0.0 m/s

Semifinals
Held on 6 September

Wind:Heat 1: -0.4 m/s, Heat 2: 0.0 m/s

Final
Held on 6 September

Wind: 0.0 m/s

References

Athletics at the 1970 Summer Universiade
1970